Lasarte is a village of the municipality of Vitoria, in the Álava province within the autonomous community of Basque Country in Spain. It is included in the Southwest Rural Zone of Vitoria.

Geography 

History 

On 4 July 1135 Lasarte was object of donation in entrusts by part of Sancho of Funes, bishop of Nájera, in the person of Pedro, archdeacon of the house of Armentia for support of the clergymen of this. In the past it flowered in this district the crop of vineyards, as it is recorded in the instrument of 1258 by which the knights of Álava yielded to the king Alfonso X the Wise person the small villages called old . As it states by a disposal dated in Boroughs on 13 May 1286, the king Sancho IV of Castilla donated it  to Vitoria. In this place the flat state of Álava used to celebrate his boards  after the dissolution of the Confrerie of Arriaga and incorporation of Álava to Castilla in 1332. The good men of the jurisdiction of Vitoria constituted the Board of Frank Infanzones of Lasarte.

Heritage 
 Church of Our Lady of The Assumption. Built originally between late 12th and early 13th centuries in romanesque style, it remains romanesque only in the facade and two vestibules, which already show the transition to Gothic. The greater part of the church is Gothic, of the 16th century. Starry, ribbed vaults cover the church, adorned with some beautiful keys made before 1511, as it prays a registration of Gothic letters.

Demography 
In 2014, Lasarte had a population of 190 inhabitants, of which 94 were men and 96 women.

References 

Populated places in Álava